Penton Corner is a hamlet in the civil parish of Penton Mewsey in the Test Valley district of Hampshire, England. Its nearest town is Andover, which lies approximately 2 miles (3 km) east from the hamlet.

Villages in Hampshire
Test Valley